This is a list of countries by population in 1600. Estimate numbers are from the beginning of the year, and exact population figures are for countries that held a census on various dates in that year. The bulk of these numbers are sourced from Alexander V. Avakov's Two Thousand Years of Economic Statistics, Volume 1, pages 15 to 17, which cover population figures from the year 1600 divided into modern borders. Avakov, in turn, cites a variety of sources, mostly Angus Maddison. 

The source used here calculates the said nations population by modern day borders, so the estimates are likely inaccurate.

See also
List of countries by population
List of countries by population in 1000
List of countries by population in 1500
List of countries by population in 1700
List of countries by population in 1800
List of countries by population in 1900

Notes

References

Kurt Witthauer. Bevölkerung der Erde (1958)
Calendario atlante de Agostini, anno 99 (2003)
The Columbia gazetteer of the world (1998)
Britannica book of the year : world data (1997)

1600
1600